Chaukhandi Stupa is a Buddhist stupa  in Sarnath located 8 kilometres from Cantt Railway Station in Varanasi, Uttar Pradesh, India. Stupas have evolved from  burial mounds and  serve as a shrine for a relic of the Buddha. The site was declared to be a monument of national importance by the Archaeological Survey of India in June 2019.

History
The Chaukhandi Stupa is thought originally to have been built as a terraced temple during the Gupta period between the 4th and 6th centuries to mark the site where Buddha and his first disciples met traveling from Bodh Gaya to Sarnath. Later Govardhan, the son of a Raja Todar Mal, modified the stupa to its present shape by building  the octagonal tower to commemorate the visit of Humayun, the powerful Mughal ruler.

Today the stupa is a high earthen mound covered with a brickwork edifice topped by an octagonal tower. It is maintained by the Archaeological Survey of India.

See also
Dhamek Stupa
Sarnath
List of Buddhist temples

Reference notes

External links

Sarnath

Buddhist temples in Uttar Pradesh
Gupta Empire
Stupas in India
History of Uttar Pradesh
Buildings and structures in Varanasi
Archaeological monuments in Uttar Pradesh
Sarnath